The Diocese of Skálholt is a suffragan diocese of the Church of Iceland. It was the estate of the first bishop in Iceland, Isleifr Gizurarson, who became bishop in 1056. (Christianity had been formally adopted in 1000). His son, Gizurr, donated it to become the official see. The Diocese was amalgamated in 1801 and now forms part of the Diocese of Iceland under the leadership of the Bishop of Iceland. In 1909, the diocese was restored as a suffragan see, with the Bishop of Skálholt being a suffragan bishop to the Bishop of Iceland.

Roman Catholic 
 1056–1080: Ísleifur Gissurarson
 1082–1118: Gissur Ísleifsson
 1118–1133: Þorlákur Runólfsson
 1134–1148: Magnús Einarsson
 1152–1176: Klængur Þorsteinsson
 1178–1193: St. Þorlákur helgi Þórhallsson
 1195–1211: Páll Jónsson
 1216–1237: Magnús Gissurarson
 1238–1268: Sigvarður Þéttmarsson (Norwegian)
 1269–1298: Árni Þorláksson
 1304–1320: Árni Helgason
 1321–1321: Grímur Skútuson (Norwegian)
 1322–1339: Jón Halldórsson (Norwegian)
 1339–1341: Jón Indriðason (Norwegian)
 1343–1348: Jón Sigurðsson
 1350–1360: Gyrðir Ívarsson (Norwegian)
 1362–1364: Þórarinn Sigurðsson (Norwegian)
 1365–1381: Oddgeir Þorsteinsson (Norwegian)
 1382–1391: Mikael (Danish)
 1391–1405: Vilchin Hinriksson (Danish)
 1406–1413: Jón (Norwegian)
 1413–1426: Árni Ólafsson
 1426–1433: Jón Gerreksson (Danish)
 1435–1437: Jón Vilhjálmsson Craxton (English)
 1437–1447: Gozewijn Comhaer (Dutch)
 1448–1462: Marcellus de Niveriis (German)
 1462–1465: Jón Stefánsson Krabbe (Danish)
 1466–1475: Sveinn spaki Pétursson
 1477–1490: Magnús Eyjólfsson
 1491–1518: Stefán Jónsson
 1521–1540: Ögmundur Pálsson

Lutheran 
1540–1548: Gissur Einarsson
1549–1557: Marteinn Einarsson
1558–1587: Gísli Jónsson
1589–1630: Oddur Einarsson
1632–1638: Gísli Oddsson
1639–1674: Brynjólfur Sveinsson
1674–1697: Þórður Þorláksson
1698–1720: Jón Vídalín
1722–1743: Jón Árnason
1744–1745: Ludvig Harboe (Danish)
1747–1753: Ólafur Gíslason
1754–1785: Finnur Jónsson
1777–1796: Hannes Finnsson
1797–1801: Geir Vídalín

The Diocese was amalgamated in 1801 and now forms part of the Diocese of Iceland.

Suffragan bishopric
The see was discontinued from 1801 to 1909. It was revived in 1909 as a suffragan bishopric to the Bishop of Iceland, with the bishop's cathedra in the traditional Skálholt cathedral church. In 1990, new legislation increased the authority and responsibilities of the Bishop of Skálholt as an assistant bishop in the Reykjavik diocese.

1909–1930: Valdimar Briem
1931–1936: Sigurður P. Sívertsen
1937–1965: Bjarni Jónsson 
1966–1983: Sigurður Pálsson 
1983–1989: Ólafur Skúlason 
1989–1994: Jónas Gíslason 
1994–2010: Sigurður Sigurðarson 
2011–2018: Kristján Valur Ingólfsson
2018–present: Kristján Björnsson

See also 
 Bishop of Iceland
 List of Hólar bishops

References

Additional sources
 Sigurdson, Erika Ruth, 'The Church in Fourteenth-Century Iceland: Ecclesiastical Administration, Literacy, and the Formation of an Elite Clerical Identity' (unpublished PhD thesis, University of Leeds, 2011), p. 242, http://etheses.whiterose.ac.uk/2610/  (pre-Reformation bishops).
 Gunnar Kristjánsson et al., eds, Saga biskupsstólanna: Skálholt 950 ára 2006, Hólar 900 ára (Akureyri: Hólar, 2006), pp. 854–55.

History of Christianity in Iceland
Church of Iceland
Skálholt
Skálholt
Skalholt
Bishops in Iceland